Makiling may refer to:

Maria Makiling, a goddess in Philippine mythology
Mount Makiling, a mountain in the Philippines
Makiling (band), a world-music band based in the Philippines
Makiling, Calamba, an upland barangay in Calamba in the province of Laguna, Philippines
La Forteresse de Makiling